Poly(N-vinylacetamide) (PNVA) is a polymer having affinity for both water and alcohol made primarily from N-vinylacetamide (NVA) monomer. The homopolymer of NVA is called GE191 grade.  Copolymer of NVA and sodium acrylate called GE167 grade.

History
Showa Denko succeeded in industrialization for the first time in the world.

Properties
Able to thicken across a wide range of pH
Able to thicken high salt concentration solutions
Resistance to acids and alkalis
Water-soluble
Adhesion and pressure sensitive adhesion
Resistant to heat

References

Acetamides
Vinyl polymers